The 2016–17 Northwestern Wildcats men's basketball team represented Northwestern University in the 2016–17 NCAA Division I men's basketball season. They were led by fourth-year head coach Chris Collins. They were members of the Big Ten Conference and played their home games at Welsh-Ryan Arena. They finished the season 24–12, 10–8 in Big Ten play to finish in a tie for fifth place. In the Big Ten tournament, they defeated Rutgers and Maryland before losing to Wisconsin in the semifinals. They received the school's first ever bid to the NCAA tournament as a No. 8 seed in the West region. In the First Round, they defeated No. 9-seeded Vanderbilt before losing to No. 1-seeded Gonzaga in the Second Round.

Previous season
The Wildcats finished the 2015–16 season with a record 20–12, 8–10 in Big Ten play to finish in ninth place. They lost to Michigan in the second round of the Big Ten tournament.

Offseason

Departures

Recruiting classes

2016 recruiting class

2017 recruiting class

Roster

Sanjay Lumpkin and Bryant McIntosh were named captain.

Schedule and results

Season notes 
The team had a winning record in conference play for the first time since the  went 8–6. The team's buzzer-beating 21st victory on March 1 against Michigan established a new school record for wins in a season. The team earned the school's first NCAA tournament bid in school history, becoming the last team from a major conference to achieve the feat.
|-
!colspan=9 style=| Exhibition

|-
!colspan=9 style=| Non-conference regular season

|-
!colspan=9 style=|Big Ten regular season

|-
!colspan=9 style=|Big Ten tournament

|-
!colspan=9 style=|NCAA tournament

Rankings

*AP does not release post-NCAA tournament rankings

Honors

McIntosh was named to the All-Big Ten second team by the coaches and the media. Scottie Lindsey was named to the third team by the coaches and honorable mention by the media. Vic Law was selected to the All-Big Ten Defensive team. McIntosh was one of ten Big Ten players honored as All-District selections by the United States Basketball Writers Association.

References

Northwestern Wildcats
Northwestern Wildcats men's basketball seasons
Northwestern
Northwestern Wild
Northwestern Wild